The House Order of Fidelity is a dynastic order of the Margraviate of Baden. It was established by Charles III William, Margrave of Baden-Durlach as a reward for merit and to mark the laying of the foundation stone of his residence at Karlsruhe Palace.

History
The order was founded at the building site of Karlsruhe Palace on 17 June 1715 and later the same day, the palace's foundation stone was laid – this was also the city of Karlsruhe's foundation date. In the city's early years until around 1732, the city's main streets were named after knights of the order, at the suggestion of one of the founding knights and one of the obervogts or city guards, Johann Christian von Günzer, who also suggested that  be used on the city's coat of arms.

On 8 May 1803, Charles Frederick, Margrave of Baden added the class of Commander to the order. After Baden was promoted to a Grand Duchy in 1806, it became one of Baden's highest orders. From 1814, it returned to being a single-class order. 

By a statute of 17 June 1840, it was expanded back into two classes and reserved for princes of the grand ducal house, foreign sovereigns and higher statesmen with the title of "Excellency". 

In 1902, the Princess Cross class was added, which was reserved for princesses born in the grand ducal house or who had married into it. Even after the monarchies of Germany were abolished, it was awarded as a dynastic order by the House of Baden.

Classes
 Grand Cross
 Commander
 Princess Cross

Insignia

Star
Its star consists of an eight-point Maltese cross with small golden balls on its tips, gold "C"s (after its founder) in the corners and a suspension loop attached to a crown on the top arm of the cross. The shield on the centre is gold plated with white enamel showing three green mountains below three gold "C"s and the motto . The rear of the gold shield shows the arms of Baden and a red fess.

Badge
This is a silver eight-arm cross, with an orange medallion on the front and four gold double "C"s on the silver arms.

Sash
This is orange with a narrow silver stripe down each side. It is worn over the right shoulder and left hip. On its left side is a gap for the badge.

Recipients
When the Order of Fidelity was reserved for foreign sovereigns, members of the ruling house and princes, the concurrent award of the Order of the Zähringer Lion continued until 1877. After that date, the Grand Cross of the Order of Berthold the First was awarded first instead.

Distribution 
The number of distributions before the end of the German monarchies (not including awards to members of the grand ducal house) were:

The following were awarded the order in diamonds:

Bibliography (in German) 
 Moritz Ruhl: Die Orden, Wappen und Flaggen aller Regenten und Staaten. Leipzig 1884. Nachdruck: Offenbach am Main 1998, .
 Maximilian Gritzner: Handbuch der Ritter- und Verdienstorden aller Kulturstaaten der Welt. Leipzig 1893, .
 Arnhard Graf Klenau: Orden in Deutschland und Österreich. Band II. Graf Klenau Verlag, Offenbach 2008, .
 Lars Adler: Die Ordensstiftungen der Markgrafen von Baden 1584–1803: adlige Korporationen im Spiegel fürstlicher Landespolitik. („Phaleristische Monographien“, Band 5), with a foreword by Bernhard, Hereditary Prince of Baden. Konstanz 2008, .
 derselbe: Friedrich Wilhelm von Steuben als Ritter des Markgräflich badischen Ordens der Treue: der Fall einer durch Adelsanmaßung erlangten Ordensmitgliedschaft im 18. Jahrhundert. In: Herold-Jahrbuch des Herold, Verein für Heraldik, Genealogie und Verwandte Wissenschaften. N.F., 11. Band (2006).
 derselbe: Ordenspokal und Temperantiabecher. Gläsergarnitur des badischen Fidelitasordens. In: Orden und Ehrenzeichen. herausgegeben von der Deutschen Gesellschaft für Ordenskunde e. V. 10. Jahrgang (2008). Heft Nr. 54, April 2008, S. 74–80.
 Hof- und Staats-Handbuch des Grossherzogthums Baden, 1841 Statuten und Liste der Ordensträger in der Google-Buchsuche

References

External links

  Statutes
  Verleihungsliste badischer Fidelitasorden 1715-1802